Midnight Madness is a 1980 American comedy film produced by Walt Disney Productions and starring David Naughton, Stephen Furst, Eddie Deezen and Maggie Roswell.

The city of Los Angeles is the game board as five teams of college students attempt to win "The Great All-Nighter", a dusk-to-dawn competition dreamed up by an eccentric graduate student. David Naughton and Stephen Furst are paired with a grab-bag group of fellow students including Michael J. Fox in his first film appearance. The film was directed and written by Michael Nankin and David Wechter.

Plot 
Graduate student Leon (Alan Solomon) summons five college students to his apartment and challenges them to participate in his latest game creation: The Great All-Nighter. He tells them about his game and instructs them to form teams. At first, the leaders refuse to play. However, rivalries between them lead all five to change their minds by the game's start time – a scenario Leon has already predicted based on his extensive planning.

Leon, as "game master", keeps track of the teams' locations with a giant map, and various radio equipment. The teams are supposed to call and check in at each clue (though many of the teams end up skipping at least one location).

The adventures of the other three teams are subplots, as well as the situation at Leon's apartment ("Game Control"). Here, along with his female assistants Candy and Sunshine (Debi Richter and Kirsten Baker), Leon monitors the progress of the game. Already unpopular with his landlady, Mrs. Grimhaus (Irene Tedrow), for the amount of noise he makes, Leon faces eviction if any of the other tenants complain. Several of them do show up to complain, but as Leon explains the mechanics of the game to them, they become fascinated with it and help run it, much to the annoyance of Grimhaus.

The game culminates in a race-to-the-finish at the Westin Bonaventure Hotel where the yellow team ultimately prevails and wins the game. A huge party consisting of all contestants and game control follows.

Teams
Teams are made up of characters who are broad stereotypes. They wear matching sweatshirts, and ride in vehicles that also match their team color.

The members of the Yellow Team are all friendly and kind; they play fair and are the main heroes of the film. The yellow team are led by the protagonist Adam (Naughton). Partway through the game, they add an additional member, Adam's troubled younger brother Scott (Michael J. Fox, in his first movie), who acts out to get Adam's attention. They also force the shy Flynch (Joel Kenney), whom Adam has been counseling, to play the game rather than allow him to go on a date with an unattractive girl. Also on the team are Laura (Debra Clinger), Adam's love interest, and Marvin (David Damas), another friend of Adam's. The team vehicle, owned by Marvin, is often referred to as a Jeep but it is actually a Toyota Land Cruiser.
The members of the Blue Team are all selfish and rude individuals who cheat at every opportunity and are the main antagonists. They are led by overweight snob and main antagonist Harold (Stephen Furst), who is intensely jealous of the popular Adam. Melio (played by future Hollywood director Andy Tennant) purposely instigates fights between Harold and his girlfriend Lucille (Patricia Alice Albrecht), who puts Harold on a diet just before the game starts. "Blade" (Sal Lopez), a Mexican-American who is constantly brandishing his switchblade knife, never speaks. An additional member, Barf (Brian Frishman), is apparently mentally challenged. The team vehicle is a Chevy van equipped with a computer that can solve clues; however, this device is destroyed early on when Harold hides a stash of marshmallows in the circuitry.
The Green Team, also known as the "Meat Machine," is made up of jocks from the school's football team. They are led by Lavitas (Brad Wilkin); the others are nicknamed "Blaylak" (Dirk Blocker), "Armpit" (Curt Ayers), "Cudzo" (Trevor Henley) and "Gerber" (Keny Long). Their antagonism drives both the Red and White teams into playing. The team vehicle is a Volkswagen Beetle named the "Meat Wagon."
The Red Team is made up of four members of an unpopular sorority, led by Donna (Maggie Roswell) and Berle (Robyn Petty) who are feminists. The other two members are a set of frequently giggling, overweight twins (Betsy Lynn and Carol Gwynn Thompson), and many of the jokes involving the red team come at their expense. The Red team's vehicle is a Datsun pickup truck, which is eventually destroyed by the Green team.
The White Team is made up of debate team nerds, led by Wesley (Eddie Deezen). The White Team rides matching Puch mopeds, which they eventually share with the Red team after their vehicle is destroyed.

Cast

Main 
 Yellow Team
 David Naughton as Adam Larson – Yellow Team Leader
 Debra Clinger as Laura – Yellow Team
 David Damas as Marvin – Yellow Team
 Joel Kenney as Flynch – Yellow Team (credited as Joel P. Kenney) 
 Michael J. Fox as Scott Larson (credited as Michael Fox)

 Blue Team
 Stephen Furst as Harold – Blue Team Leader
 Patricia Alice Albrecht as Lucille – Blue Team
 Andy Tennant as Melio – Blue Team
 Brian Frishman as Barf – Blue Team
 Sal Lopez as Blade – Blue Team

 Red Team
 Maggie Roswell as Donna – Red Team Leader
 Robyn Petty as Berle – Red Team
 Betsy Lynn Thompson as Peggy – Red Team
 Carol Gwynn Thompson as Lulu – Red Team

 White Team
 Eddie Deezen as Wesley – White Team Leader
 Marvin Katzoff as Debater #1 – White Team
 Christofer Sands as Debater #2 – White Team
 Michael Gitomer as Debater #3 – White Team

 Green Team
 Brad Wilkin as Lavitas – Green Team Leader
 Dirk Blocker as Blaylak – Green Team
 Curt Ayers as Armpit – Green Team
 Trevor Henley as Cudzo – Green Team
 Keny Long as Gerber – Green Team

Supporting 
 Irene Tedrow as Mrs. Grimhaus
 Alan Solomon as Leon
 Deborah Richter as Candy (credited as Debi Richter)
 Kirsten Baker as Sunshine
 John Fiedler as Wally Thorpe
 Ceil Gabot as Mrs. Thorpe
 Charlie Brill as Jerry – Tenant #1
 Loretta Tupper as Mr. Thorpe's Mother
 Eddie Bloom as Game Control Bookie
 Dave Shelley as Harold's Father
 Marvin Kaplan as Bonaventure Desk Clerk
 Bert Williams as Security Captain
 Arthur Adams as Police Sergeant
 Thomas Wright as Cop #1 (credited as Tom Wright)
 Elven Havard as Cop #2
 Ernie Fuentes as Miniature Golf Dad
 Pilar Del Rey as Miniature Golf Mom (credited as Pillar Del Rey)
 Georgia Schmidt as Old Lady in Car
 J. Brennan Smith as Bratty Kid
 Don Maxwell as Bratty Kid's Dad
 Paul Reubens as Pinball City Proprietor
 John Voldstad as Bellboy
 Jack Griffin as Tow Truck Driver
 Dick Winslow as Tourist
 Emily Greer as Teenage Girl #1
 Paula Victor as Cashier
 Tony Salome as Irving
 Donna Garrett as Busty Waitress

Production notes 
Paul Reubens (better known as Pee-wee Herman) has a small part as the "Pinball City Proprietor". Other cameos include John Fiedler as Wally Thorpe, one of the other tenants, and Marvin Kaplan as the Bonaventure desk clerk. Future film director Andy Tennant plays a member of the Blue team.

Johnie's Fat Boy was Johnie's Coffee Shop located at the corner of Wilshire Blvd and Fairfax on the western edge of the Miracle Mile. Though it closed in 2000, the building is still used for filming.

Pinball City was Castle Park (later Malibu Castle) Miniature Golf in North Hollywood. Located at 12400 Vanowen St., it closed in 1998.

The Star Fire game in the video arcade that provides the clue to the final destination was an actual arcade game of the period. The game play was real; however a special open cabinet for a standing player had been created for the movie, since the real game cabinet was an enclosed cockpit in which the player was seated.

The movie was novelized in a 1980 paperback, Midnight Madness, by Tom Wright (Ace, 1980) 

This was Michael J. Fox's first motion picture. He is credited as Michael Fox.

Release and reception 
Midnight Madness was rated PG—only the second film from the Disney company to receive anything other than a "G" (the first was The Black Hole). Although produced by Disney, the company's name did not appear on the credits.

The film only experienced a limited release, and garnered bad reviews. Roger Ebert, in his review, expressed disappointment at the film, as he was a fan of the early work of Nankin and Wechter. It ultimately grossed $2.9 million in the North American box office.

The film lost Disney a reported $4.5 million.

After a 2001 DVD release from Anchor Bay Entertainment, Midnight Madness was re-released in 2004 by Disney DVD with the "Walt Disney Pictures Presents" logo—the first time that Disney has officially associated itself with the film.

Legacy 
Midnight Madness has inspired many spin-offs and other Alternate Reality Games (ARG).  Among some of the more popular recreations are:

 Midnight Madness (Hot Springs, Arkansas) – Played every December, timed to coincide with collegiate members of the community being in central Arkansas on winter break. Last played 2011 with the theme "Brain Drained," a retrospective of "'90s Kid" optimism, television, and games.
 Midnight Madness (Austin, Texas) – The Austin game is played biannually and was created by several Austin transplants including two veterans from the Hot Springs game.
 Midnight Madness Brevard (Brevard County, Florida) – Played on a regular basis, with multiple games being held each year.
 Midnight Madness VT (Greater Burlington, Vermont) – Runs multiple games per year. midnightmadnessvt on Facebook.
 The Game – a non-stop 24- to 48-hour puzzle solving race that is currently active in the San Francisco Bay area and the Seattle area
 Mike's Hunt, a 24-hour game played by the members of the Rutgers University Glee Club, has a heavy clue-solving component, with the clues leading to the development of a storyline in which the players become involved.
 Get-a-Clue (Atlanta) – Played annually by members of the Georgia Tech Yellow Jacket Marching Band and friends. Interactive and "nerdy" clues centering on a theme/storyline lead participants around the city and nearby counties.
 Minnie's Moonlit Madness (Anaheim, California) – Each year hundreds of Disney cast members raise money for charity by participating in a trivia Q&A and scavenger hunt in Disneyland or Disney's California Adventure after park operating hours.
 Midnight Madness Events (New Jersey) - runs Midnight Madness events in the New Jersey, New York, Pennsylvania, and Connecticut area for towns, private paries, and fundraisers.  Interactive game in cars with teams of 4 to 6 players on a 15 clue route.  https://www.midnightmadnessevents.com/

In popular culture 
 Rap duo Heltah Skeltah sampled the film's theme for their song of the same name.
 The stop motion animation program Robot Chicken (shown on Adult Swim) has featured brief homages to Midnight Madness, two in "Episode 1–10: Badunkadunk", and one in "Episode 2–6: 1987". In the first episode, two scenes from the film are reenacted, one where Leon reveals himself to the team leaders, another where Blue Team member Barf assembles the letters of a clue into the nonsense word "Fagabeefe". In the second, the chant of "Meat Machine" is reenacted.

See also 
Films with similar plot elements:
 It's a Mad, Mad, Mad, Mad World (1963)
 The Last of Sheila (1973)
 Scavenger Hunt (1979)
 Million Dollar Mystery (1987)
 Rat Race (2001)
 Ready Player One (2018)

References

External links 

 
 
 
 
 
 

 Comprehensive Synopsis/Review at 3B Theater
 DVD review at Digitally Obsessed

1980 films
1980s teen comedy films
American teen comedy films
Walt Disney Pictures films
Films set in Los Angeles
Films shot in Los Angeles
Treasure hunt films
Films produced by Ron W. Miller
1980 comedy films
1980s English-language films
1980s American films